Massimo Tarantino (born May 20, 1971 in Palermo) is a retired Italian professional football player and the current technical director of S.P.A.L.

Coaching and management
Tarantino passed the sporting director exam in 2007 and then joined A.C. Pavia 1911 S.S.D. On 27 May 2010, he became the head of the Bologna F.C. 1909 youth department.
From July 2013 to September 2019, he was part of the youth staff at A.S. Roma alongside Bruno Conti.
In August 2021, he joined S.P.A.L. as technical director.

2022 supermarket stabbing
In October 2022, Tarantino made international news after being named as one of two people who immobilised a man who had stabbed six people, including fellow footballer Pablo Marí, in a Milan supermarket, killing one person. Tarantino and one other person disarmed and held the attacker until police arrived.

Honours
 Serie A champion: 1989/90 (loaned out after playing 1 league game)
 UEFA Intertoto Cup winner: 1998

References

1971 births
Living people
Italian footballers
Serie A players
Serie B players
Catania S.S.D. players
S.S.C. Napoli players
A.C. Monza players
Bologna F.C. 1909 players
Como 1907 players
U.S. Triestina Calcio 1918 players
F.C. Pavia players
Association football defenders
Footballers from Palermo